Tina Rainford (born December 25, 1946) is a singer from Berlin, Germany. She was a friend of Drafi Deutscher from school days onwards, and the wife of Peter Rainford until 1971.

Her musical career began in 1963 under the pseudonym of Peggy Peters, helped by Drafi Deutscher who wrote and produced her hits.  Assuming her real name in 1967, she recorded several duets with her husband Pete.

After her divorce she united with Drafi Deutscher again, who wrote songs for her under the pseudonym Renate Vaplus, produced them under his real name, and acted as a supporting act on her 1976-1978 tours as Jack Goldbird. They also performed a duet song Alaska in 1972 as Tina & Drafi.

Rainford's greatest success came in 1976 with the issuance of her song, "Silver Bird." It became a significant hit, charting internationally in two languages. The English version was a Country & Western hit in the U.S. and Canada, as well as a Pop hit in Australia.  The German version became especially popular in central Europe. The follow-up single Fly Away Pretty Flamingo also became a big hit in the German speaking central European countries. Both hits were written and produced by Drafi Deutscher.

Rainford has been active as recently as 2016, recording an LP with Anna Lena, When Ladys meet.

References

1946 births
Living people
Singers from Berlin
German women singers
German pop singers